is a Japanese manga series written and illustrated by Jiro Taniguchi. It was serialized in Futabasha's Manga Action and published in a single volume in September 2002.

Publication
The series is written and illustrated by Jiro Taniguchi. It was serialized in Monthly Action and published in a single tankōbon volume on September 28, 2002.

Fanfare and Ponent Mon published the series in English.

Reception
A columnist for Manga News stated that while the manga doesn't going to blow any minds, it is a solid read. HWR from Anime UK News praised the first volume, calling it "unique". Joseph Arrouet from Planete BD also offered praise for the series, specifically the plot. Christel Scheja from Splash Comics shared the opinion of Arrouet, praising the plot. Sherryn from Manga Sanctuary also praised the plot, while stating that some of the characters are underdeveloped.

References

Comics set in the 19th century
Futabasha manga
Jiro Taniguchi
Seinen manga
Western (genre) anime and manga